The First Dynasty of ancient Egypt (Dynasty I) covers the first series of Egyptian kings to rule over a unified Egypt. It immediately follows the unification of Upper and Lower Egypt, possibly by Narmer, and marks the beginning of the Early Dynastic Period, a time at which power was centered at Thinis.

The date of this period is subject to scholarly debate about the Egyptian chronology. It falls within the early Bronze Age and is variously estimated to have begun anywhere between the 34th and the 30th centuriesBC. In a 2013 study based on radiocarbon dates, the beginning of the First Dynasty—the accession of Narmer (commonly known as Menes)—was placed at 3100BC give or take a century (3218–3035, with 95% confidence).

The dynasty

Information about this dynasty is derived from a few monuments and other objects bearing royal names, the most important being the Narmer Palette and Narmer Macehead, as well as Den and Qa'a king lists. No detailed records of the first two dynasties have survived, except for the terse lists on the Palermo Stone. The account in Manetho's Aegyptiaca contradicts both the archeological evidence and the other historical records: Manetho names nine rulers of the First Dynasty, only one of whose names matches the other sources, and offers information for only four of them. Egyptian hieroglyphs were fully developed by then, and their shapes would be used with little change for more than three thousand years.

Alena Buis noted: 

S.O.Y. Keita, a biological anthropologist, conducted a study on First Dynasty crania from the royal tombs in Abydos and noted the predominant pattern was "Southern" or a “tropical African variant” (although others were also observed) that had affinities with Kerma Kushites. The general results demonstrate greater affinity with Upper Nile Valley groups, but also suggest clear change from earlier craniometric trends. The gene flow and movement of northern officials to the important southern city may explain the findings.

Human sacrifice

Human sacrifice was practiced as part of the funerary rituals associated with all of the pharaohs of the first dynasty.  It is clearly demonstrated as existing during this dynasty by retainers being buried near each pharaoh's tomb as well as animals sacrificed for the burial. The tomb of Djer is associated with the burials of 338 individuals.  The people and animals sacrificed, such as donkeys, were expected to assist the pharaoh in the afterlife. For unknown reasons, this practice ended with the conclusion of the dynasty.

Rulers
Known rulers in the history of Egypt for the First Dynasty are as follows:

See also
 
 Early Dynastic Period (Egypt)
 
 First Dynasty of Egypt family tree

References

Citations

Bibliography
 .
 

 
States and territories established in the 4th millennium BC
States and territories disestablished in the 3rd millennium BC
01
31st century BC in Egypt
30th century BC in Egypt
29th century BC in Egypt
4th-millennium BC establishments
3rd-millennium BC disestablishments in Egypt
4th millennium BC in Egypt
3rd millennium BC in Egypt